Don Smith may refer to:
Don Carlos Smith (1816–1841), American leader, missionary, and periodical editor in the early days of the Latter Day Saints movement
Don Smith (ice hockey, born 1887) (1887–1959), Canadian ice hockey player
Don Smith (author), (1909–?), Canadian journalist and author of spy novels
Don Smith (basketball, born 1910) (1910–1994), American college basketball player at the University of Pittsburgh
Don Smith (basketball, born 1920) (1920–1996), American basketball player with the Minneapolis Lakers
Don Smith (ice hockey, born 1929) (1929–2002), Canadian ice hockey player with the New York Rangers
Don Smith (motorcyclist) (1937–2004), British motorcycle trials rider
Zaid Abdul-Aziz (born 1946), American basketball player, born Don Smith
Don Smith (basketball, born 1951) (1951–2004), American basketball player with the Philadelphia 76ers
Don Smith (defensive lineman) (born 1957), American football defensive lineman
Don Smith (boxer) (born 1963), Trinidad and Tobago boxer
Don Smith (running back) (born 1963), American football running back
Don Smith (rower) (born 1968), American rower
Don Smith (songwriter), co-writer of the popular song "Double Shot (Of My Baby's Love)"

See also
Donn Smith (born 1949), Canadian football player
Donald Smith (disambiguation)
Donnie Smith (born 1990), American soccer player